Stuart Horton (born 10 September 1963), also known by the nickname of "Corgi", is an English former professional rugby league footballer who played in the 1980s and 1990s, and coached in the 1990s.

Playing career

Challenge Cup Final appearances
Stuart Horton played as an interchange/substitute (replacing  Kevin Beardmore) in Castleford's 15–14 victory over Hull Kingston Rovers in the 1986 Challenge Cup Final during the 1985–86 season at Wembley Stadium, London on Saturday 3 May 1986, in front of a crowd of 82,134.

County Cup Final appearances

References

External links

Picture - Stewart Horton - Great Britain Rugby League
Oldham pray for a long run 
Picture - Trading Card - Stuart Horton
Back to the city
Tenth anniversary year of York City Knights 2002-2012
Hall to aim for in club’s new bow to an eternal Fame
Memories fired up by Hall of Fame debate

1963 births
Living people
Castleford Tigers players
English rugby league coaches
English rugby league players
Place of birth unknown
Rugby league hookers
York Wasps coaches
York Wasps players